The 2022–23 EFA Cup is the second season of the EFA Cup, the League Cup. The 18 Premier League clubs will take part in the competition.

Future FC is the defending champion, having won the inaugural tournament 5–1 over Ghazl El Mahalla.

Preliminary round 
The draw for the preliminary round was held on 9 November 2022.

Round of 16 
The draw for the round of 16 was held on 14 March 2023. The eight games will take place in March 2023.

Top goalscorers

Notes

References 

Egyptian Premier League